The NAIA Women's Swimming and Diving Championships comprise the annual swim meet held, since 1981, to determine the national champions of women's NAIA collegiate swimming and diving in the United States and Canada.

The most successful program are Simon Fraser, with 11 NAIA national titles.

Keiser (FL) are the reigning national champions, winning their first championship in 2022.

Results

Champions

Team titles

 Schools highlight in yellow have reclassified athletics from the NAIA.

Championship records

Yards

See also
 List of college swimming and diving teams
NAIA Men's Swimming and Diving Championships
AIAW Women's Swimming and Diving Championships
NCAA Women's Swimming and Diving Championships (Division I, Division II, Division III)
NCAA Men's Swimming and Diving Championships (Division I, Division II, Division III)

References

External links
NAIA Women's Swimming Championship History
NAIA Women's Swimming and Diving

NAIA championships
National swimming competitions
Women's sports in the United States